Moss Kent Platt (May 3, 1809 – March 1, 1876) was an American merchant and politician from New York.

Life
He was the son of William Pitt Platt (1771–1835, son of Zephaniah Platt) and Hannah Kent (sister of Chancellor James Kent).

On October 14, 1830, he married Elizabeth S. Freligh (1810–1856), and they had four daughters, and one son: John Freligh Platt (1837–1858) who died while a senior at Williams College.

In 1847, he began the manufacture of iron near the Saranac river from iron ore mined west of Plattsburgh. He built plank roads to connect the iron works with the city and with Clinton State Prison, and employed the prison inmates to work in his plant.

In 1852, he built a railroad from Plattsburgh to the Canada–US border which connected the city with Montréal. After his first wife's death, he married on May 20, 1858, her half-sister Margaret Anne Freligh (1814–1908).

He was a Republican member of the New York State Senate (16th District) in 1866 and 1867. In 1868, he ran for presidential elector on the Ulysses S. Grant ticket, but New York was won by Democrat Horatio Seymour. In 1873, he was elected an Inspector of State Prisons, and died in office.

Sources
The New York Civil List compiled by Franklin Benjamin Hough, Stephen C. Hutchins and Edgar Albert Werner (1867; pages 444 and 447)
Google Books Life Sketches of State Officers, Senators, and Members of Assembly in the State of New York in 1867 by S. R. Harlow and H. H. Boone (pages 138f; Weed, Parsons & Co., Albany NY, 1867)
THE SYRACUSE CONVENTION in NYT on July 9, 1868 [gives erroneously "Moses R. Platt"]
 Platt genealogy, at RootsWeb

1809 births
1876 deaths
Politicians from Plattsburgh, New York
New York State Prison Inspectors
Republican Party New York (state) state senators
19th-century American railroad executives
19th-century American politicians